Rotten Island is a small island close to the entrance of Killybegs Harbour, an inlet of Donegal Bay, in County Donegal, Ireland.

Features

Rotten Island lighthouse was established in 1838 and is still operational. It has a white conical masonry tower with a red gallery 	and is operated by the Commissioners of Irish Lights.

Demographics

Other projects

References

Islands of County Donegal
Uninhabited islands of Ireland